Rim Tai is a tambon (subdistrict) of Mae Rim District, in Chiang Mai Province, Thailand. In 2020 it had a total population of 8,566 people.

Administration

Central administration
The tambon is subdivided into 8 administrative villages (muban).

Local administration
The whole area of the subdistrict is covered by the subdistrict municipality (Thesaban Tambon) Mae Rim (เทศบาลตำบลแม่ริม).

References

External links
Thaitambon.com on Rim Tai

Tambon of Chiang Mai province
Populated places in Chiang Mai province